O'Donnell High School is a 1A high school located in O'Donnell, Texas (USA). It is part of the O'Donnell Independent School District located in southeast Lynn County. In 2011, the school was rated "Academically Acceptable" by the Texas Education Agency.

Athletics
The O'Donnell Eagles compete in the following sports:

Cross Country, 6-Man Football, Basketball, Track & Baseball

Notable alumnus

Dan Blocker - Actor/played role of "Hoss" in the NBC television series Bonanza.

References

External links
O'Donnell ISD
List of Six-man football stadiums in Texas

Public high schools in Texas
Public middle schools in Texas